The Marble River (also known as Marbel, Marbol River, Sulphur River) is a river in the province of Cotabato in the Philippines. It is located at the foot of Mount Apo. The Marble River connects to the Kabacan River in Cotabato, a tributary of the Pulangi River which empties into the Rio Grande de Mindanao in Cotabato City.

Landforms of Cotabato
Rivers of the Philippines